The Men's omnium was held on 20 October 2012. 13 riders participated.

Medalists

Results

Overall results
After six events.

Flying lap
It was held at 12:54.

Points race
It was held at 19:42.

Elimination race
It was held at 21:18.

Individual pursuit
It was held at 10:25.

Scratch race
It was held at 12:16.

1000m time trial
It was held at 17:20.

References

Men's omnium
European Track Championships – Men's omnium